The Montane Cordillera Ecozone, as defined by the Commission for Environmental Cooperation (CEC), is an ecozone in south-central British Columbia and southwestern Alberta, Canada (an ecozone is equivalent to a Level I ecoregion in the United States).  A rugged and mountainous ecozone spanning 473,000 square kilometres, it still contains "two of the few significant agricultural areas of the province", the Creston Valley and the Okanagan Valley. Primarily a mountainous region, it consists of rugged ecosystems such as alpine tundra, dry sagebrush and dense conifer forests. The interior plains are encircled by a ring of mountains. The area has a mild climate throughout the year, with typically dry summers and wet winters.

The corresponding name in the United States for this ecozone, where it is classed as a Level I ecoregion by the United States Environmental Protection Agency, which is identical though differently-named than the CEC system, is the Northwestern Forested Mountains ecoregion.

Geography
It contains the headwaters for the Fraser and Columbia rivers and many of their tributaries, notably the Thompson and Kootenay.

It is bordered to the west by the Pacific Maritime Ecozone, to the north by the Boreal Cordillera Ecozone, to the northeast by the Boreal Plains Ecozone, and to the southeast by the Prairies Ecozone.

Ecoprovinces
This ecozone can be further subdivided into four ecoprovinces:
Central Montane Cordillera
Columbia Montane Cordillera
Northern Montane Cordillera
Southern Montane Cordillera

Conservation

National parks
Seven national parks have been established in this ecozone:
Banff National Park
Glacier National Park
Jasper National Park
Kootenay National Park
Mount Revelstoke National Park
South Okanagan-Similkameen National Park Reserve (proposed)
Waterton Lakes National Park
Yoho National Park

Provincial parks
Dozens of provincial parks have been established in this ecozone. Some of the largest and most notable ones include:
Itcha Ilgachuz Provincial Park
Kakwa Provincial Park
Mount Robson Provincial Park
Purcell Wilderness Conservancy Provincial Park
Tweedsmuir South Provincial Park
Wells Gray Provincial Park

See also
Canadian Rockies
Columbia Mountains
Thompson Plateau

References

Ecozones of Canada
Ecozones and ecoregions of Alberta
Ecozones and ecoregions of British Columbia